State Road 321 (NM 321) is a  state highway in the US state of New Mexico. NM 321's western terminus is at NM 114 in Causey, and the eastern terminus is at Farm to Market Road 54 (FM 54) at the Texas–New Mexico state line.

Major intersections

See also

References

321
Transportation in Roosevelt County, New Mexico